Bell (postcode: 2786) is a small rural and residential village in the Blue Mountains region of New South Wales, Australia.

Description and history
Bell is named after Archibald Bell, Jr., who was the first colonial man to map the route over the Blue Mountains via Richmond. This crossing had been partly explored by colonial explorer George Caley, who went as far as Mount Banks in 1804, but Bell was the first colonial explorer to go the whole way from the Richmond area to the Bell area thanks to Indigenous guides, Darug men Emery and Cogy, who were already quite familiar with the route. The Bells Line of Road was later established along this route.

Bell is on the Main Western railway line. Bell railway station was originally named Mount Wilson railway station.

Bell is entirely surrounded by native bush, most of which is part of the Blue Mountains National Park. This section of the park is dominated by the Wollangambe River, which begins north of Bell and flows to the Colo River. The area is rugged, stony country with few tracks. A walking trail from Bell gives access to the Wollangambe River and is used as a starting point by experienced bushwalkers venturing into the Wollangambe Wilderness.

Bell enjoys a cool mountain climate, with snow falls occurring most years.

As Bell's Line of Road is the only alternative route to the Great Western Highway over the Blue Mountains, Bell is the site of an RTA Heavy Vehicle Checking Station.

References

External links
 Blue Mountains City Council Community Profile

Towns in New South Wales
Suburbs of the City of Blue Mountains
City of Lithgow